Gho Manhasan is a town and a Municipal committee in Jammu district  in the state of Jammu and Kashmir, India.

Geography
It has an average elevation of 311 metres (1,020 feet).

Demographics
 India census, Gho Manhasan had a population of 3944. Males constitute 53.5% of the population and females 46.5%. Gho Manhasan has an average literacy rate of 69%, higher than the national average of 59.5%: male literacy is 74%, and female literacy is 63%. The local language primarily spoken in Gho Manhasan and nearby areas is Dogri.

According to the 2011 census, 91.4% of the residents were Hindus, 7.9% were Sikhs and 0.6% were Christians.

References

Cities and towns in Jammu district